Spermophorides lascars is a species of spiders of the family Pholcidae. The species is endemic to Silhouette Island of Seychelles.

References

Pholcidae
Spiders described in 2001
Spiders of Africa
Endemic fauna of Seychelles